Pontiac Community Consolidated School District 429 is a school district headquartered in Pontiac, Illinois, United States, serving three elementary schools and one junior high school.

By 2014, Kevin Lipke had left his post as superintendent. On Thursday February 20, 2014, the district hired Bushue Human Relations Company, a company in Effingham, Illinois, to handle insurance, human resources, risk management, and other aspects so the district's costs are lowered.

Schools
Pontiac Jr. High School
Elementary schools:
Central Elementary School
Lincoln Elementary School
Washington Elementary School

See also
 Pontiac Township High School (Pontiac Township High School District #90)

References

External links
 

Education in Livingston County, Illinois
Pontiac, Illinois
School districts in Illinois